Coco County is a nickname of two counties in the United States:

 Coconino County, Arizona
 Contra Costa County, California